Matthew Goodson (16 April 1863 – 3 June 1919) was a New Zealand cricketer. He played one first-class match for Taranaki in 1891/92.

See also
 List of Taranaki representative cricketers

References

External links
 

1863 births
1919 deaths
New Zealand cricketers
Taranaki cricketers
Cricketers from Whanganui